Taochuan is a town located in the Jiangyong County of Yongzhou, Hunan, China.

References

Towns of Hunan
Jiangyong